Kwiatków may refer to:

Kwiatków, Ostrów Wielkopolski County in Greater Poland Voivodeship (west-central Poland)
Kwiatków, Turek County in Greater Poland Voivodeship (west-central Poland)
Kwiatków, Opole Voivodeship (south-west Poland)